Thelymitra macrophylla, commonly called the large-leafed sun orchid or scented sun orchid, is a species of flowering plant in the orchid family Orchidaceae, and is endemic to the south-west of Western Australia. It has a single thick, broad, leathery leaf and up to twenty five relatively large dark blue to purplish flowers with white, toothbrush-like tufts.

Description
The side lobes have toothbrush-like tufts of white hairs. The flowers are strongly scented, insect pollinated and open in sunny weather. Flowering occurs from August to October.

Taxonomy and naming
Thelymitra macrophylla was first formally described in 1840 by John Lindley from a specimen collected by James Drummond and the description was published in A Sketch of the Vegetation of the Swan River Colony. The specific epithet (macrophylla) is derived from the Ancient Greek words makros meaning "long" and phyllon meaning "leaf".

Distribution and habitat
The large-leafed sun orchid is widespread and common between Perth and Albany, growing in jarrah forest and wandoo woodland.

Conservation
Thelymitra macrophylla is classified as "not threatened" by the Western Australian Government Department of Parks and Wildlife.

References

External links
 

macrophylla
Endemic orchids of Australia
Orchids of Western Australia
Plants described in 1840